ATP synthase-coupling factor 6, mitochondrial is an enzyme subunit that in humans is encoded by the ATP5PF gene.

Function 

Mitochondrial ATP synthase catalyzes ATP synthesis, utilizing an electrochemical gradient of protons across the inner membrane during oxidative phosphorylation. It is composed of two linked multi-subunit complexes: the soluble catalytic core, F1, and the membrane-spanning component, FO, which comprises the proton channel. The F1 complex consists of 5 different subunits (alpha, beta, gamma, delta, and epsilon) assembled in a ratio of 3 alpha, 3 beta, and a single representative of the other 3. The FO seems to have nine subunits (a, b, c, d, e, f, g, F6 and 8). This gene encodes the F6 subunit of the FO complex, required for F1 and FO interactions. Alternatively spliced transcript variants encoding different isoforms have been identified for this gene.

The F6 subunit is part of the peripheral stalk that links the F1 and FO complexes together, and which acts as a stator to prevent certain subunits from rotating with the central rotary element. The peripheral stalk differs in subunit composition between mitochondrial, chloroplast and bacterial F-ATPases. In mitochondria, the peripheral stalk is composed of one copy each of subunits OSCP (oligomycin sensitivity conferral protein), F6, b and d. There is no homologue of subunit F6 in bacterial or chloroplast F-ATPase, whose peripheral stalks are composed of one copy of the delta subunit (homologous to OSCP), and two copies of subunit b in bacteria, or one copy each of subunits b and b' in chloroplasts and photosynthetic bacteria.

References

External links

Further reading